Fundamental rights are a group of rights that have been recognized by a high degree of protection from encroachment. These rights are specifically identified in a constitution, or have been found under due process of law. The United Nations' Sustainable Development Goal 16, established in 2015, underscores the link between promoting human rights and sustaining peace.

List of important rights 
Some universally recognised rights that are seen as fundamental, i.e., contained in the United Nations Universal Declaration of Human Rights, the U.N. International Covenant on Civil and Political Rights, or the U.N. International Covenant on Economic, Social and Cultural Rights, include the following:

 Right to self-determination
 Right to liberty
 Right to due process of law
 Right to freedom of movement
 Right to privacy
 Right to freedom of thought
 Right to freedom of religion
 Right to freedom of expression
 Right to peaceful assembly
 Right to freedom of association

Specific jurisdictions

Canada 

In Canada, the Charter of Rights and Freedoms outlines four Fundamental Freedoms. These are freedom of:
 Conscience and religion
 Thought, belief, opinion, and expression, including freedom of the press and other media of communication
 Peaceful assembly
 Association.

Europe 
On a European level, fundamental rights are protected in three laws: 
 The Charter of Fundamental Rights of the European Union
 The Fundamental Freedoms of the European Union
 The European Convention on Human Rights

Japan 
In Japan, fundamental rights protected by the Constitution of Japan include:

 Civil liberties, including the right to liberty and the right to freedom of expression, thought, conscience and religion
 Social rights, including the right to receive education and the right to maintain the minimum standards of wholesome and cultured living

India 
There are six fundamental rights recognized in the Constitution of India:

 the right to equality (Articles 14-18),
 the right to freedom (Article 19, 22),
 the right against exploitation (Articles 23-24),
 the right to freedom of religion (Articles 25-28),
 cultural and educational rights (Articles 29-30) and
 the right to constitutional remedies (Article 32 and 226).

United States 
Though many fundamental rights are also widely considered human rights, the classification of a right as "fundamental" invokes specific legal tests courts use to determine the constrained conditions under which the United States government and various state governments may limit these rights. In such legal contexts, courts determine whether rights are fundamental by examining the historical foundations of those rights and by determining whether their protection is part of a longstanding tradition. In particular, courts look to whether the right is "so rooted in the traditions and conscience of our people as to be ranked as fundamental." Individual states may guarantee other rights as fundamental. That is, States may add to fundamental rights but can never diminish and rarely infringe upon fundamental rights by legislative processes. Any such attempt, if challenged, may involve a "strict scrutiny" review in court.

In American Constitutional Law, fundamental rights have special significance under the U.S. Constitution. Those rights enumerated in the U.S. Constitution are recognized as "fundamental" by the U.S. Supreme Court. According to the Supreme Court, enumerated rights that are incorporated are so fundamental that any law restricting such a right must both serve a compelling state purpose and be narrowly tailored to that compelling purpose.

The original interpretation of the United States Bill of Rights was that only the Federal Government was bound by it. In 1835, the U.S. Supreme Court in Barron v Baltimore unanimously ruled that the Bill of Rights did not apply to the states. During post-Civil War Reconstruction, the 14th Amendment was adopted in 1868 to rectify this condition, and to specifically apply the whole of the Constitution to all U.S. states. In 1873, the Supreme Court essentially nullified the key language of the 14th Amendment that guaranteed all "privileges or immunities" to all U.S. citizens, in a series of cases called the Slaughterhouse cases. This decision and others allowed post-emancipation racial discrimination to continue largely unabated.

Later Supreme Court justices found a way around these limitations without overturning the Slaughterhouse precedent: they created a concept called Selective Incorporation. Under this legal theory, the court used the remaining 14th Amendment protections for equal protection and due process to "incorporate" individual elements of the Bill of Rights against the states. "The test usually articulated for determining fundamentality under the Due Process Clause is that the putative right must be 'implicit in the concept of ordered liberty', or 'deeply rooted in this Nation's history and tradition.'" Compare page 267 Lutz v. City of York, Pa., 899 F. 2d 255 - United States Court of Appeals, 3rd Circuit, 1990.

This set in motion a continuous process under which each individual right under the Bill of Rights was incorporated, one by one. That process has extended more than a century, with the free speech clause of the First Amendment first incorporated in 1925 in Gitlow v New York. The most recent amendment completely incorporated as fundamental was the Second Amendment right to keep and bear arms for personal self-defense, in McDonald v Chicago, handed down in 2010 and the Eighth Amendment's restrictions on excessive fines in Timbs v. Indiana in 2019.

Not all clauses of all amendments have been incorporated. For example, states are not required to obey the Fifth Amendment's requirement of indictment by grand jury. Many states choose to use preliminary hearings instead of grand juries. It is possible that future cases may incorporate additional clauses of the Bill of Rights against the states.

The Bill of Rights lists specifically enumerated rights. The Supreme Court has extended fundamental rights by recognizing several fundamental rights not specifically enumerated in the Constitution, including but not limited to:
 The right to interstate travel
 The right to parent one's children
 The right to privacy
 The right to marriage
 The right of self-defense  
Any restrictions a government statute or policy places on these rights are evaluated with strict scrutiny.  If a right is denied to everyone, it is an issue of substantive due process. If a right is denied to some individuals but not others, it is also an issue of equal protection. However, any action that abridges a right deemed fundamental, when also violating equal protection, is still held to the more exacting standard of strict scrutiny, instead of the less demanding rational basis test.

During the Lochner era, the right to freedom of contract was considered fundamental, and thus restrictions on that right were subject to strict scrutiny.  Following the 1937 Supreme Court decision in West Coast Hotel Co. v. Parrish, though, the right to contract became considerably less important in the context of substantive due process and restrictions on it were evaluated under the rational basis standard.

See also 
Fundamental Rights Agency of the European Union
Inalienable rights
Universal human rights

References 

Constitutional law
Rights
Civil rights and liberties